The South African Railways Class 6 4-6-0 of 1893 was a steam locomotive from the pre-Union era in the Cape of Good Hope.

In 1893 and 1894, the Cape Government Railways placed forty 6th Class steam locomotives with a  wheel arrangement in service, twenty-two on its Western System and eighteen on its Midland System. Ten of them were sold to the Oranje-Vrijstaat Gouwerment-Spoorwegen in 1897. At the end of the Second Boer War in 1902, these ten became the Class 6-L1 on the Central South African Railways. In 1912, all forty locomotives were renumbered and designated Class 6 when they were assimilated into the South African Railways.

Design
To meet the increasing weight of fast passenger trains on the Western and Midland Systems, the 6th Class 4-6-0 passenger steam locomotive was conceived and designed at the Salt River works of the Cape Government Railways (CGR) at the same time as the 7th Class, both according to the specifications of Michael Stephens, then Chief Locomotive Superintendent of the CGR, and under the supervision of H.M. Beatty, then Locomotive Superintendent of the Western System. Whereas the 7th Class was conceived primarily as a goods locomotive, the 6th Class was intended to be its fast passenger service counterpart.

The engines and tenders were built by Dübs and Company and were delivered in 1893 and 1894, numbered in the ranges from 139 to 160 for the Western System and 353 to 370 for the Midland System.

Characteristics
The seats of the driver and stoker were mounted on poles which allowed them to be swung around to outside the cab.

The 6th Class was to become one of the most useful classes of locomotives to see service in South Africa. They were fast, easy to handle, good steamers and had an exceptionally low maintenance cost, with long periods between major overhauls.

They were so advanced over previous designs that C.B. Elliot, General Manager of the CGR at the time, stated in his annual report in 1894 that the increased speed of which they were capable would render practicable the running of passenger trains between Cape Town and Johannesburg in 48 hours. P.A. Hyde, Chief Locomotive Superintendent of the Central South African Railways (CSAR) from 1902 to 1904, considered the 6th Class as "about the best design for their weight ever made".

Service

Cape Government Railways

The 6th Class was introduced primarily as a passenger locomotive, but when it became displaced by larger and more powerful locomotive classes, it literally became a Jack-of-all-trades which proved itself as one of the most useful and successful locomotive types to be designed at the Salt River shops. It would eventually see service in all parts of the country, except Natal, and would be used on all types of traffic.

Oranje-Vrijstaat Gouwerment-Spoorwegen
Two of the Western and eight of the Midland System's locomotives were sold to the Oranje-Vrijstaat Gouwerment-Spoorwegen (OVGS) in 1897 and renumbered in the OVGS number range from 60 to 69. The OVGS designated them 6th Class L.

Central South African Railways
When the Orange Free State was occupied by the invading British forces during the Second Boer War, these OVGS locomotives were taken over and used by the Imperial Military Railways (IMR), but not renumbered. When the IMR reverted to civilian control after the war and became established as the CSAR in 1902, these ten locomotives were designated CSAR Class 6-L1 and renumbered in the range from 336 to 345.

South African Railways
When the Union of South Africa was established on 31 May 1910, the three Colonial government railways (CGR, Natal Government Railways and CSAR) were united under a single administration to control and administer the railways, ports and harbours of the Union. Although the South African Railways and Harbours came into existence in 1910, the actual classification and renumbering of all the rolling stock of the three constituent railways was only implemented with effect from 1 January 1912.

In 1912, these forty locomotives were renumbered in the range from 401 to 440 on the South African Railways (SAR) and designated . The rest of the CGR's 6th Class locomotives, together with the Class 6-L2 and 6-L3 locomotives which had been inherited by the CSAR from the OVGS via the IMR, were grouped into thirteen more sub-classes by the SAR. The  locomotives were designated SAR Classes 6A to 6H and 6J to 6L, the  locomotives were designated SAR Class 6Y and the  locomotives were designated Class 6Z.

In Cape Town, the Class 6 held a monopoly over the suburban service until electrification took place in 1928. On the Reef, they also worked in suburban service between Randfontein and Springs until the loads became too heavy for them. They were employed on branchlines all over the country, Natal excepted, and practically every big station and several smaller ones had its quota of these handy locomotives to work the local passenger, goods and shunting services.

Sudan Railways
During the Second World War, sixteen locomotives of the Classes 6 to 6D were transferred to the Middle East to assist with the war effort during the North African Campaign. The seven Class 6 locomotives in this group were numbers 402, 403, 406, 417, 421, 423 and 436. They were sold to the Sudan Railways Corporation in 1942 and were renumbered in the range from M700 to M706, in the same order as their former SAR engine numbers.

Modifications
Several of the CSAR's Class 6L1 to 6-L3 locomotives were modified by P.A. Hyde by having their round-top fireboxes replaced with larger boilers and Belpaire fireboxes and by having larger, more sheltered cabs installed. This conversion improved their performance tremendously, to the extent that they could be used in place of the 8th Class where they were formerly outclassed by load. This represented an increase in hauling capacity of some 12% while their coal consumption was reduced by some 5%. Of the CSAR Class 6-L1 locomotives, only no. 336 underwent this modification.

As a result, several of the SAR Classes 6, 6A and 6B locomotives were similarly modified in later years, without altering their classifications. During the 1930s, many of them were modified once again, when the Chief Mechanical Engineer of the SAR at the time, A.G. Watson, embarked on his program of standardisation and reboilered them with round-topped fireboxes once again while retaining the larger cabs. These engines were not reclassified.

Renumbering
By the time the last ones were eventually withdrawn from service in 1973, the Class 6 had achieved a service life of eighty years, a performance which can be matched by few other locomotive classes worldwide. During their long service lives, some of the 6th Class locomotives underwent multiple renumbering. All were initially numbered into the CGR's Western and Midland Systems rosters. Fourteen of the Midland's locomotives, in the number ranges from 353 to 355 and 360 to 370, were later renumbered in the ranges from 553 to 555 and 560 to 570. At the time when the renumbering took place, the four which were not renumbered, numbers 356 to 359, had already been sold to the OVGS.

It would appear that the Western System was more concerned with having unbroken number ranges than the CGR itself was about awarding different classifications to dissimilar locomotives, even if they were of different wheel arrangements. The numbers of the two Western System locomotives which had been sold to the OVGS, 155 and 160, were subsequently allocated again to two of the batch of fourteen locomotives which were delivered by Neilson, Reid and Company in 1902 and which were to become the Class 6J.

All forty locomotives were eventually renumbered onto the SAR's roster in 1912, designated SAR Class 6 and renumbered in the range from 401 to 440. Only one of the Class 6 locomotives underwent all these renumberings, from CGR no. 365 to CGR no. 565, then OVGS no. 65, then CSAR no. 341, then SAR no. 436 and finally Sudan Railways no. M706.

The table lists their years in service and Dübs works numbers, as well as all their renumbering.

Preserved Locomotives
Three survive in South Africa.
 No. 429 is plinthed on display at Graaf Reinet.
 No. 432 is on display at the Union Carriage & Wagon Works in Nigel.
 No. 439 is operational with Rovos Rail on the Luxury Train Pride of Africa on occasions. Named Tiffany.

Illustration
The main picture shows ex Midland System no. 368, later renumbered no. 568, then OVGS 6th Class L no. 68, then CSAR Class 6-L1 no. 344, then SAR Class 6 no. 439 and finally Rovos Rail's restored Tiffany. The following pictures illustrate the Class 6 in service and preserved, with different fireboxes, various headlight types which were in use over the years and with different types of tender.

References

1310
1310
4-6-0 locomotives
2′C n2 locomotives
Steam locomotives of Sudan
Dübs locomotives
Cape gauge railway locomotives
Railway locomotives introduced in 1893
1893 in South Africa
Passenger locomotives